Juhani Jasu (born 19 January 1988) is a Finnish ice hockey player who currently plays professionally in Finland for HC TPS of the Liiga.

References

External links

1988 births
Living people
Lukko players
Finnish ice hockey forwards
HPK players
Tappara players
HC TPS players